Estola hirsutella is a species of beetle in the family Cerambycidae. It was described by Per Olof Christopher Aurivillius in 1922 and is known from Chile.

References

Estola
Beetles described in 1922
Endemic fauna of Chile